WHBM (90.3 FM) is a radio station licensed to Park Falls, Wisconsin. The station is part of Wisconsin Public Radio (WPR), and airs WPR's "Ideas Network", consisting of news and talk programming.

See also Wisconsin Public Radio

References

External links
Wisconsin Public Radio

HBM
Wisconsin Public Radio
NPR member stations